Saint-Marie (originally Saint Mary), is a civil parish in Kent County, New Brunswick, Canada.

For governance purposes, most of the parish belongs to the town of Champdoré, with small areas along its eastern and northern boundaries belonging to the town of Grand-Bouctouche and the village of Five Rivers, respectively; all are members of the Kent Regional Service Commission.

Prior to the 2023 governance reform, the parish was divided between the village of Saint-Antoine and the local service districts of Grand Saint-Antoine and the parish of Saint Mary.

Origin of name
The parish's name may have come from a church.

History
Sainte-Marie was erected as Saint Mary in 1867 from Wellington Parish.

In 1871 the Renauds Mills area of Sainte-Marie was returned to Wellington.

In 1883 Sainte-Marie annexed part of Harcourt Parish east of the railway.

In 1888 Saint-Paul Parish was erected from all of the parish west of McLaughlin Road.

In 1973 the parish's name was legally changed to Sainte-Marie.

Boundaries
Sainte-Marie Parish is bounded:

on the north by the prolongation of a line running south 68º west from the mouth of the Rivière Chockpish-nord to Route 490;
on the east by a line beginning south of Renauds Mills Road, east of Saint-Antoine, then northwesterly straight along grant lines to the Little Buctouche River, then downriver past the prolongation of Chemin Yvon-à-Fred, then northwesterly along to the rear line of a tier of grants straddling Kay Road and across a Crown reserved road that continues Chemin Alban-Légère, then northeasterly along the northwestern side of the Crown reserved road to the eastern line of a grant that runs along part of Dunlop Road, then northwesterly along the grant line to the Buctouche River, then across the river and up Mill Creek to a grant line on the prolongation of Deep Gully Road, then northwesterly along the grant line to Girouardville Road, then southwesterly along Girouardville Road to the southernmost corner of a grant at the corner of Girouardville Road and Mill Creek Road, then northwesterly along the western line of the grant and its prolongation to Mill Creek, then upstream to the eastern line of a grant on the eastern side of Black River Road, then northwesterly along the grant line to Saint-Maurice Road, then southwesterly along Saint-Maurice Road to the western line of a small grant opposite the end of Black River Road, then northwesterly along the grant line and its prolongation to the rear line of grants along the Arsenault Settlement Road, then northeasterly to the western line of a grant that includes the junction of East Branch Road and Arsenault Settlement Road, then north to the northern line of the parish;
on the south by a line beginning on the shore of Northumberland Strait near Bar-de-Cocagne, then running south 72º 30' west to the western line of a grant on the western side of the junction of Gérard Road and Robichaud Cross Road, a bit north of Robichaud Cross Road, then southwesterly along the grant line to the northwestern line of a grant straddling Gérard Road, part of a tier of grants on the northwestern side of Alexandrina Road, then southwesterly along the rear line of the tier and its prolongation to Route 490;
on the west by Route 490.

Communities
Communities at least partly within the parish; bold indicates an incorporated municipality; italics indicate a name no longer in official use

Bastarache
Champdoré
Coates Mills
Haut-Saint-Antoine
Kent Boom
McNairn
Murphy Settlement
Pelerin
Roy
Saint-Antoine
Saint-Cyrille
Saint-Damien
Saint-Fabien
Saint-Lazare
Sainte-Marie-de-Kent
South Saint-Norbert
Upper Buctouche

Bodies of water
Bodies of water at least partly in the parish:
Buctouche River
Little Buctouche River
Mill Creek

Demographics
Parish population total does not include the village of Saint-Antoine

Population
Population trend

Language
Mother tongue (2016)

See also
List of parishes in New Brunswick

Notes

References

Local service districts of Kent County, New Brunswick
Parishes of Kent County, New Brunswick